Theresa McLaurin Needham (April 17, 1912 - October 16, 1992) was an American tavern owner who became known as "the Godmother of the Chicago blues".  She was posthumously inducted into the Blues Hall of Fame in 2001.

Born Theresa McLaurin in Meridian, Mississippi, she was raised Catholic, married Robert Needham and moved to Chicago in the 1940s.

In December 1949 she opened a basement club, Theresa's Lounge (sometimes also called T’s Basement), in an apartment building on South Indiana Avenue on the South Side of Chicago.  This attracted a predominantly black audience from the surrounding neighbourhood, but its appeal reached global proportions as a result of the calibre of music offered.  It featured live entertainment with Junior Wells and Buddy Guy in the house band, and attracted touring musicians such as Muddy Waters, Jimmy Rogers, Otis Spann, Little Walter, Otis Rush, Earl Hooker and Howlin' Wolf.

The club relocated in 1983 when the landlord refused to renew the lease, and closed permanently in 1986.  Theresa Needham died in Chicago in 1992. In 2010 The Black Ensemble theater in Chicago produced a play based on Theresa's Lounge written by Joe Plummer called "Nothing But The Blues."

External links
 Tribute page
 1983 New York Times article

References

1912 births
1992 deaths
Drinking establishment owners
20th-century African-American women
20th-century African-American people
Businesspeople from Chicago
20th-century American businesspeople
African-American Catholics